Mohammadabad (also Romanized as Moḩammadābād and Muhammadābād; also known as Moḩammadābād-e Rīgān) is a city and capital of Rigan County, Kerman Province, Iran.  At the 2006 census, its population was 5,773, in 1,295 families.

References

Populated places in Rigan County

Cities in Kerman Province